Penipe Canton is a canton of Ecuador, located in the Chimborazo Province.  Its capital is the town of Penipe.  Its population at the 2001 census was 6,485.

The canton consists of one urban parish, Penipe Parish and six rural ones:
 Bayushig Parish	
 Bilbao Parish
 La Candelaria Parish	
 El Altar Parish	
 Matus Parish	
 Puela Parish

References

Cantons of Chimborazo Province